Icknield is a parliamentary ward, of the Luton district, in the town of Luton, Bedfordshire, England. The ward takes its name from the Icknield Way, a pre-Roman road which passes through Luton. Situated towards the northeast of Luton, the ward is made up of parts of Runfold and Warden Hill, as well as Bushmead.

Politics

Icknield ward is represented by Cllr Asif Masood (Labour) and Cllr Jeff Petts (Conservative).

The ward forms part of the parliamentary constituency of Luton North and the MP is Sarah Owen (Labour).

Local Attractions

References

 Luton Borough Council

Wards of Luton